Trinity Island or Île de la Trinité or Isla Trinidad is an island  long and  wide in the northern part of the Palmer Archipelago, Antarctica. The island was named by Otto Nordenskiöld, leader of the 1901-1904 Swedish Antarctic Expedition (SAE) in commemoration of Edward Bransfield's "Trinity Land" of 1820.

History
Trinity Island, or the adjoining Davis Coast stretch of the Antarctic Peninsula, may have been the first part of Antarctica spotted by Nathaniel Palmer, on 16 November 1820. He was an American sealer, exploring southwards from Cape Horn in his little sloop searching for seal rookeries. The whole archipelago was named in his honour in 1897 by Adrien de Gerlache, leader of the Belgian Antarctic Expedition.

Geography

Trinity Island is one of the most northerly of the islands of the Palmer Archipelago, a chain of more than fifty islands running parallel with the coast of the Antarctic Peninsula. Many of these geographic features have been charted and named by various Antarctic expeditions, as well as the nations of Argentina and Bulgaria.

Trinity Island is separated from Tower Island to the east by Gilbert Strait. Both islands are separated from the Davis Coast to the south by Orléans Strait, running northeast–southwest. To the southwest, Chayka Passage separates Trinity Island from Spert Island by just .

Northern portion 
Cape Wollaston marks the island's northwest extremity. The name was originally applied by the 1828-1831 British Chanticleer expedition for William H. Wollaston, commissioner of the Royal Society from 1818–28. Both features were named for Bulgarian fishing trawlers from the Ocean Fisheries company. Continuing east, Cape Neumayer forms the northeast end of Trinity Island. It was charted by the SAE and named after German geophysicist Georg B. von Neumayer.

On the west coast, Preker Point sits  to the southwest of Cape Wollaston. It is named for a mountain in the Balkan Mountains. Burya Point, formed by an offshoot of Ketripor Hill, divides Saldobisa from Olusha Cove to the south. It was named for Burya, a village in Bulgaria.

Continuing south down the west coast, just north of Lyon Peak, sits Milburn Bay, fed by Pastra Glacier. The bay was shown on an Argentine government chart of 1952 and named by the UK Antarctic Place-Names Committee (UKAPC) in 1960 for M. R. Milburn, an air traffic control officer of the Falkland Islands and Dependencies Aerial Survey Expedition (FIDASE), which photographed this area in the period 1955–57.

Southern portion 

Three small, rocky islands lie in the northern part of the bay. The bay and its islands are named for locations in Bulgaria: the villages of Dink, Krivina, and Rogulyat, and Imelin Cave.

It is named for Belimel in northwestern Bulgaria. The bay is defined on the north by Spert Island and to the south by Asencio Point. The point is named for Alferez de Navío Salvador Asencio of the Uruguay. Tizoin Point, named for a cave in Bulgaria, projects southwards into the middle of the bay.

Awl Point was shown on an Argentine government chart of 1952, and named by the UKAPC in 1960 because the point is low in elevation but very sharply pointed in plan, suggesting an awl.

The southernmost point of the island is called Skottsberg Point, which marks the west side of Mikkelsen Harbor, the most prominent feature on the southern half of the island.

Offshore features 

Important Bird Areas

Cape Wollaston
Cape Wollaston, at the northwest extremity of the island, has been designated an Important Bird Area (IBA) by BirdLife International because it supports a large breeding colony of about 10,000 pairs of southern fulmars. The  site comprises the ice-free land of the cape. It has an elevation of about 250 m.

Trinity Island south-west
Chinstrap penguins also nest at the site.

See also
 List of Antarctic and subantarctic islands

References

External links
 Trinity Island Copernix satellite image of Trinity Island

 
Islands of the Palmer Archipelago
Important Bird Areas of Antarctica
Seabird colonies